David Allen Barr (born March 1, 1952) is a Canadian professional golfer who has played on the Canadian Tour, PGA Tour and Champions Tour.

Barr was born in Kelowna, British Columbia. He attended Oral Roberts University in Tulsa, Oklahoma and was a member of the golf team. He finished as runner-up in the 1972 Canadian Amateur Championship.

Barr turned professional in 1974. From 1974 to 1978, he played on the Canadian Professional Golf Tour, where he earned 12 victories. He played on the PGA Tour from 1978 to 2002. He continued to support the Canadian circuit by playing several events per year, even after he joined the PGA Tour, although the Canadian events had much lower prize money.

Barr had two wins on the PGA Tour. His first, which he calls the biggest thrill of his golf career, was at the 1981 Quad Cities Open. In 1987, Barr won the Georgia-Pacific Atlanta Golf Classic. His best finish in a major was T2 at the 1985 U.S. Open.

After turning 50 in 2002, Barr began play on the Champions Tour. He became the first Canadian to win a Champions Tour event, the 2003 Royal Caribbean Golf Classic.

Barr was inducted into the Canadian Golf Hall of Fame in 2000, and is also a member of the British Columbia Sports Hall of Fame. He lives in Kelowna, British Columbia. Barr won the 2007 Canadian PGA Seniors' Championship at The Marshes Golf Club in Ottawa. He was also given a lifetime membership on the Canadian Tour.

Professional wins (19)

PGA Tour wins (2)

PGA Tour playoff record (1–2)

Canadian Tour wins (12)
1975 British Columbia Open
1977 British Columbia Open, Alberta Open, Quebec Open
1978 British Columbia Open
1981 Victoria Open
1985 Canadian PGA Championship, Quebec Open
1986 Quebec Open
1987 Manitoba Open
1988 Canadian TPC, Manitoba Open

Other wins (3)
1977 Washington Open
1983 World Cup (team with Dan Halldorson and individual event)

Champions Tour wins (1)

Other senior wins (1)
2007 Canadian PGA Seniors' Championship

Results in major championships

Note: Barr never played in The Open Championship.

CUT = missed the half-way cut
WD = withdrew
"T" = tied

Summary

Most consecutive cuts made – 7 (1984 PGA – 1987 Masters)
Longest streak of top-10s – 1

Canadian national team appearances
Amateur
Eisenhower Trophy: 1972

Professional
World Cup: 1977, 1978, 1982, 1983 (individual winner), 1984, 1985 (winners), 1987, 1988, 1989, 1990, 1991, 1993, 1994
Dunhill Cup: 1985, 1986, 1987, 1988, 1989, 1991, 1993, 1994 (winners), 1995

See also
Fall 1977 PGA Tour Qualifying School graduates
1996 PGA Tour Qualifying School graduates

References

External links

Profile at Canadian Golf Hall of Fame

Canadian male golfers
Oral Roberts Golden Eagles men's golfers
PGA Tour golfers
PGA Tour Champions golfers
Golfing people from British Columbia
Sportspeople from Kelowna
Canadian expatriate sportspeople in the United States
1952 births
Living people